Laurence Broderick, is a British sculptor. His best known work is 'The Bull', a public sculpture erected in 2003 at the Bull Ring, Birmingham. The Bull  is about 4.5 meters long, about 190 cm high and weighs about 6.5 tons. It is one of the largest bronze animal sculptures in the country. His work consists largely of figurative carvings in stone and editions in bronze.

Early life
Broderick was born in Bristol, in the west of England, in 1935, and attended Bembridge School on the Isle of Wight. He studied painting, illustration and sculpture under Ray Millard and Geoffrey Deeley at the Regent Street Polytechnic from 1952 to 1957, and with Sidney Harpley and Keith Godwin at the Hammersmith School of Art from 1964 to 1965.

Career
Broderick began his artistic career as an historical and educational illustrator and painter. He taught Art at the Haberdashers' Aske's School in Cricklewood from 1959 and Elstree from 1961, and was Director of Art there from 1965 to 1981. He continued working as a freelance artist and sculptor throughout this period and became a full-time sculptor in 1981.

Predominantly a stone carver, working with many types of stone including: Marble, Alabaster, Soapstone, Hopton Wood and Ancaster Limestone, he also models in clay, plasticine, plaster and wax for casting in bronze.

In 1983 he competed as part of the British snow sculpture team during The Quebec Winter Carnival. The team gained second place.

Broderick is a member of the Royal British Society of Sculptors and a fellow of the Royal Society of Arts.

In 1978 Broderick visited the Isle of Skye with his young family where saw his first wild otter. It was just off the Island of Ornsay, once owned by Gavin Maxwell, the Scottish naturalist and author best known for his work with otters. Skye became Broderick's second home and he held annual sculpture exhibitions on the island for 26 years. He now divides his time between studios on Skye and Waresley near Cambridge, England.

Broderick is joint president of the International Otter Survival Fund, a charity dedicated to the conservation, protection and care of otters in the UK and around the world.

Commissions and collections

The Bull, Birmingham
Leaping Salmon, Chester Business Park
Annual World Champion Trophies, International Tennis Federation
Goddess Athena and the Owl, Royal Caribbean International
Family of Otters, E.ON UK plc, Coventry
Turtle, Prudential plc Art Collection, London
Mother and Child, Diageo plc, Perth.
Indian Elephant Calf, Royal Caribbean International
Teko, Kyleakin, Isle of Skye
Madonna and Child, All Saints, Weston-super-Mare
Tortoise, Turtle & Mayan Figures, Vision of the Seas
Crucifix, The Priory, Christchurch
Madonna of the Magnificat, The Priory, Dunstable
St Mark and the Lion, St Mark's, Mansfield
Sir Roy Calne, Addenbrookes Hospital, Cambridge
June Marchioness of Aberdeen and Temair, Haddo Arts Trust
Philippe Chatrier, International Tennis Federation, Stade Roland Garros, Paris
Maxwell Otter, ADC Ltd, Aberdeen.
Teko, Balloch, Loch Lomond.
Elephant Calf, Java Hill Resort, Crozet, Ain, France.

Exhibitions 

Group shows with the Royal Academy, Royal Scottish Academy, Royal Society of British Artists, Contemporary Portrait Society, Society of Wildlife Artists and the Royal West of England Academy.

Exhibitions in Scotland, England, Jersey, France, Monaco, Germany, USA and Canada.

References

Published works

Works containing Broderick's illustrations

External links
 The Bull.
 Laurence Broderick official website
 Laurence Broderick, Royal Society of British Sculptors
 The International Otter Survival Fund
 Installation of The Bull at Birmingham Bullring
 'Maxwell Otter' at ADC Ltd , Aberdeen
 Top Ten Public Art at The Independent
 Carving Video
 YouTube Gallery

1935 births
20th-century British sculptors
21st-century sculptors
English sculptors
English male sculptors
Living people
People educated at Bembridge School
Artists from Bristol
People from the Isle of Skye